Alessandro Polidori (born 24 February 1992) is an Italian footballer who plays as a forward for  club Viterbese.

Career
He made his Serie C debut for Rimini on 6 September 2015 in a game against Tuttocuoio.

On 22 August 2018, he joined Serie C club Viterbese on a season-long loan. Viterbese held a buyout option at the end of the loan term.

On 12 July 2019, he signed a 2-year contract with Siena.

On 3 January 2020, he joined Piacenza on loan until the end of the 2019–20 season. Piacenza holds the purchase option, if that option is exercised at the end of the loan, the contract will automatically be extended to 30 June 2022.

On 1 September 2020 he moved to Imolese on a 2-year contract.

On 23 July 2021, he signed with Monterosi. On 27 January 2022, he returned to Viterbese on loan, with an option to buy.

References

External links
 

1992 births
Living people
People from Viterbo
Footballers from Lazio
Sportspeople from the Province of Viterbo
Italian footballers
Association football forwards
Serie B players
Serie C players
Serie D players
Rimini F.C. 1912 players
Delfino Pescara 1936 players
S.S. Arezzo players
F.C. Pro Vercelli 1892 players
Trapani Calcio players
U.S. Viterbese 1908 players
A.C.N. Siena 1904 players
Piacenza Calcio 1919 players
Imolese Calcio 1919 players
Monterosi Tuscia F.C. players